Sky Financial Group, Inc., was a diversified financial services holding company that operated in the Midwestern United States from 1998 until its 2007 acquisition by rival bank Huntington Bancshares. Its largest subsidiary was Sky Bank, a commercial and retail banking company headquartered in Salineville, Ohio, that operated 330 financial centers and over 400 ATMs in Ohio, Pennsylvania, Indiana, Michigan and West Virginia. Other wholly owned subsidiaries included investment, trust, and insurance services.

Sky Financial Group was headquartered in Bowling Green, Ohio, and was formed by the 1998 "merger of equals" of the $2.2 billion Mid Am, Inc., of Bowling Green and the $1.8 billion Citizens Bancshares, Inc., of Salineville. 
The resulting $4 billion company ranked as the 96th largest American bank. At the time of its 2007 acquisition by Huntington, Sky Financial Group was the 43rd largest bank holding company in the country with over $17.6 billion in assets. 
The company had 4330 employees.

Huntington acquisition 

On December 20, 2006, Sky Financial Group announced that Huntington Bancshares, based out of Columbus, Ohio, would be taking over the company. This was considered a merger, with Huntington Bancshares taking the upper hand. 
Beginning in March, Sky and Huntington began consolidating and closing redundant offices. When completed, Sky's major operations centers in Bowling Green, Ohio, Toledo, Ohio, Cleveland, Ohio, and East Liverpool, Ohio, were then closed. Additionally, 88 banking centers (about 25% of Sky's total footprint) were consolidated. Huntington's withdrawal in these markets has resulted in their weakening economically. Several  have questioned the impact on local economy this merger will have on the communities where Sky and Huntington co-exist, including Ohio Congressman Dennis Kucinich (D-Cleveland). Congressman Kucinich had asked the Cleveland Federal Reserve Bank to hold hearings concerning the Sky-Huntington merger, however, the Federal Reserve approved the merger without regard to Kucinich's requests.

Acquisition and merger history 
Prior to its merger with Huntington Bancshares, Sky completed fourteen acquisitions and mergers during its nine years of operation.

References

External links
Sky Financial Group

American companies established in 1998
Banks established in 1998
2007 mergers and acquisitions
Banks based in Ohio
Banks disestablished in 2007
Companies based in Toledo, Ohio
Defunct banks of the United States
Huntington Bancshares